Gertrude M. Godden (1867–1947) was an author of works on anthropology and folklore.

Gertrude Mary Godden was born in Surbiton, Surrey. Born in a catholic family she took a special interest in the rise of Soviet Russia. One of her correspondents was a Father Ledit.  Godden is listed as a fellow of the Anthropological Institute. Amongst her works are papers in the journal Folk-Lore, a manuscript on the Naga and other peoples of Northeast India, and a memoir of Henry Fielding. She also wrote on Mussolini.

A namesake, Gertrude M. Godden O.B.E., was president (1956–58) of the Royal College of Nursing in London.

References

External links
 
 

British folklorists
Women folklorists
British anthropologists
British biographers
Women biographers
Officers of the Order of the British Empire
1867 births
1947 deaths